Rocquefort is a commune in the Seine-Maritime department in the Normandy region in northern France.

Geography

Heraldry

Population

Places of interest
 The church of Notre-Dame, dating from the nineteenth century.
 A nineteenth-century chapel.
 An eighteenth-century chateau.
 A feudal motte.

See also
Communes of the Seine-Maritime department

References

External links

Official website 

Communes of Seine-Maritime